Hurtz is a surname. Notable people with the surname include:

Emily Hurtz (born 1990), Australian field hockey player
Michael Hurtz (born 1979), German darts player

See also
Hertz (surname)
Herz (surname)